Richard Woods may refer to:
 Richard Woods (diplomat) (born 1941), New Zealand diplomat and public servant
 Richard Woods (politician), American politician, Georgia Superintendent of Schools

See also
 Richard Wood (disambiguation)